Micraroa is a genus of moths in the subfamily Lymantriinae. The genus was erected by George Hampson in 1905. Both species are found in southern Africa.

Species
Micraroa minima Janse, 1915
Micraroa rufescens Hampson, 1905

References

Lymantriinae